Sandra Dini (born 1 January 1958 in Florence) is a retired Italian high jumper.

Biography
She finished eleventh at the 1981 European Indoor Championships. She became Italian champion in 1981 and 1984.

National titles
In the "Sara Simeoni era", Sandra Dini has won 4 times the individual national championship.
2 wins in high jump (1981, 1984)
2 wins in high jump indoor (1982, 1985)

See also
Italian all-time top lists - High jump

References

External links
 
Athlete profile at All-athletics.com

1958 births
Living people
Italian female high jumpers
Sportspeople from Florence
Mediterranean Games bronze medalists for Italy
Athletes (track and field) at the 1983 Mediterranean Games
Mediterranean Games medalists in athletics
20th-century Italian women
21st-century Italian women